SM The Performance is a dance project group, formed by SM Entertainment in 2012. The group made their first appearance on SBS Gayo Daejeon in December 2012. The group consists of members of other groups of SM, the first formation being composed of U-Know , Eunhyuk , Donghae , Taemin , Minho , Kai  and Lay .

History
The group made their first appearance on SBS Gayo Daejeon on December 29, 2012, featuring a dance number with the song "Spectrum" in collaboration with Zedd and performed by U-Know , Eunhyuk and Donghae , Taemin and Minho , and Kai and Lay . The choreography was created by Tabitha and Napoleon D'umo, who have collaborated with Christina Aguilera, BoA in "Only One" and TVXQ in "Humanoids". The song was released as digital single the next day, debuting at #43 on the Gaon Digital Chart. The group performed at the SM Town Live World Tour III in Tokyo Special Edition between October 26 and 27, 2013.

In February 2017, SM Entertainment announced the return of the group after years in hiatus, as part of the second season of the musical project Station. At the beginning of April Ten  was formally introduced as a member of the group. The song "Dream in a Dream" was released on April 7 as part of the Station project, being promoted as Ten's solo single and group song.

Discography

References

SM Entertainment artists
Musical groups established in 2012
K-pop music groups
South Korean dance music groups
South Korean idol groups
2012 establishments in South Korea